Allan Crossley (born 1952) is a former British strongman competitor, notable for having won the title of Britain's Strongest Man, as well as having been both the British light-heavy and heavyweight arm wrestling champion.

Biography 
Allan Crossley was born in Coleraine, Northern Ireland, in 1952. He trained in a number of gyms as a teenager and went on to become a professional bouncer and a doorman. As a sportsman he first made his name as an arm wrestler, winning the British light-heavyweight title and going on to win the British heavyweight title, (However he did lose in an exhibition arm wrestle to champion boxer David Pearce in 1984 in Bristol). He then entered the world of strength athletics. In Britain's Strongest Man he came fourth in the 1980 and 1983 versions of the event, before winning the title in 1984. This enabled Crossley to qualify for the 1984 Europe's Strongest Man in which he represented the United Kingdom alongside Geoff Capes, the then current World's Strongest Man.

As a doorman he gained significant renown. He was featured in a 1989 episode of the BBC Bristol series 10x10, entitled Hardman. He was later featured as one of the three British bouncers including, Lenny McLean and John 'The Neck' Houchin, in Steven Cantor's film Bounce: Beyond the Velvet Rope, in which his portrayal has been described as "a soft spoken professed Christian, who can quote Shakespeare whenever the mood takes him, but who prefers handling obnoxious customers in their most pliable state - knocked unconscious".

Crossley also features in a book about Lenny McLean's life, entitled:

(The Guv'nor - Revealed) By writing duo Lee Wortley and Anthony Thomas.

This book of untold stories also features his lifelong friend John 'The Neck' Houchin.

Over the years, in and amongst the cobble-fighting hierarchy, it has been stated that Crossley and his unnatural power and speed were unmatched, and many who have worked alongside him have said that in his heyday, not a soul would have had the brawn to go toe-to-toe with him.

What is more, it has been documented in various crime magazines that a life story is currently being written, and that ‘writer and best selling author‘ Lee Wortley is the man behind it.

References

1952 births
British strength athletes
Living people